David Jardine may refer to:

 David Jardine (barrister) (1794–1860), English barrister and magistrate
 David Jardine (footballer) (1867-?), Scottish football goalkeeper
 David Jardine (merchant) (1818–1856), taipan of the Jardine, Matheson & Co.

See also
 David Jardine Jardine (1847–1922), Scottish landowner and racehorse owner